Piotr Szczotka (born June 17, 1981) is a Polish professional basketball player who last played for Asseco Gdynia of the Polish Basketball League. Szczotka usually plays as shooting guard.

Since 7 years Piotr is straint conditioning coach in club Asseco Gdynia . 

The older brother - Grzegorz Szczotka, also played basketball. He was the captain of the Polish national team, during the European Championships in 2011, played in Lithuania [1].

OsiągnięciaEdytuj

As of 11/04/2016, based on 

], unless otherwise stated.

Team

 5-time Polish champion (2003, 2009, 2010, 2011, 2012)

Polish Super Cup winner (2010)

Finalist:

Polish Cup (2004, 2009)

Polish Super Cup (2011, 2012)

Euroleague quarter-finalists (2010)

Participant of the competition:

Euroleague (2008-2013)

FIBA EuroCup Challenge (2002/03)

individual

Two times the best defender of PLK (2011, 2012) 

Best in defense of PLK according to journalists (2011) 

The second five PLK according to journalists (2011) 

Athlete of the Year of Gdynia (2013) 

Representation

Participant Eurobasket (2011)

References

1981 births
Living people
Asseco Gdynia players
Astoria Bydgoszcz players
Czarni Słupsk players
KK Włocławek players
People from Jarosław
Sportspeople from Podkarpackie Voivodeship
Polish men's basketball players
Shooting guards
Stal Ostrów Wielkopolski players
Unia Tarnów basketball players